= Bitsihuitsos Butte =

Landform in Arizona

Coordinates: 36.4147°N 109.8315°W

Bitsihuitsos Butte is a summit in the U.S. state of Arizona.

Bitsihuitsos is a name derived from the Navajo language meaning "tapered formation at its base.
